Eric Webster (born 27 April 1936) is a former Australian rules footballer who played with Essendon in the Victorian Football League (VFL). He later played one season for Port Melbourne in the Victorian Football Association before returning to the country to play with Trafalgar.

He is the nephew of Essendon player, Len Webster.

Notes

External links 
		

Essendon Football Club past player profile

1936 births
Living people
Australian rules footballers from Victoria (Australia)
Essendon Football Club players
Port Melbourne Football Club players